In coding theory, a Tanner graph, named after Michael Tanner, is a bipartite graph used to state constraints or equations which specify error correcting codes. In coding theory, Tanner graphs are used to construct longer codes from smaller ones. Both encoders and decoders employ these graphs extensively.

Origins 
Tanner graphs were proposed by Michael Tanner as a means to create larger error correcting codes from smaller ones using recursive techniques. He generalized the techniques of Elias for product codes.

Tanner discussed lower bounds on the codes obtained from these graphs irrespective of the specific characteristics of the codes which were being used to construct larger codes.

Tanner graphs for linear block codes 

Tanner graphs are partitioned into subcode nodes and digit nodes. For linear block codes, the subcode nodes denote rows of the parity-check matrix H. The digit nodes represent the columns of the matrix H. An edge connects a subcode node to a digit node if a nonzero entry exists in the intersection of the corresponding row and column.

Bounds proved by Tanner 
Tanner proved the following bounds

Let  be the rate of the resulting linear code, let the degree of the digit nodes be  and the degree of the subcode nodes be . If each subcode node is associated with a linear code (n,k) with rate r = k/n, then the rate of the code is bounded by

Computational complexity of Tanner graph based methods 
The advantage of these recursive techniques is that they are computationally tractable.  The coding
algorithm for Tanner graphs is extremely efficient in practice, although it is not
guaranteed to converge except for cycle-free graphs, which are known  not to admit asymptotically
good codes.

Applications of Tanner graph 
Zemor's decoding algorithm, which is a recursive low-complexity approach to code construction, is based on Tanner graphs.

Notes 

Michael Tanner's Original paper
Michael Tanner's page

Coding theory
Application-specific graphs